Johnnie B. Dirden, Jr. (born March 14, 1954) is a former American football player.  He played professionally as a wide receiver for three seasons in the National Football League (NFL) with the Houston Oilers, the Kansas City Chiefs, and the Pittsburgh Steelers. He now resides in Denver, Colorado.

References

1954 births
Living people
American football wide receivers
Houston Oilers players
Kansas City Chiefs players
Pittsburgh Steelers players
Sam Houston Bearkats football players
Players of American football from Houston